Brad Smith (born 27 September 1975) is an Australian former professional rugby league footballer who played in the 1990s.

Background 
Smith played his junior rugby league at Hurstville United.

Playing career 
Smith started his career at the St. George Dragons, his local club, in the 1995 ARL season. His debut was from the bench, playing in a 25–12 win against the Western Suburbs Magpies in round 16. He played there for four years, predominantly off the bench. His first try was against the Gold Coast Chargers in a 18–12 win in round 4 of the 1997 ARL season. He scored again later that season against the North Sydney Bears in a 54–14 loss three weeks later.

In 1999, he moved to the Balmain Tigers. He scored on his club debut against the Melbourne Storm in a 16–6 win in round 2 of the 1999 NRL season.

References 

1975 births
Living people
Rugby league second-rows
Australian rugby league players
St. George Dragons players
Balmain Tigers players